Austroboletus subflavidus is a species of bolete fungus in the family Boletaceae. It is found in eastern North America, where it fruits near oak and pine trees. Originally described as a species of Tylopilus by American mycologist William Murrill in 1938, it was transferred to the genus Austroboletus by Carl B. Wolfe in 1980. The pores on the cap underside, which measure about 1 mm wide, are initially white to grayish before becoming pinkish. The spore print is reddish brown; spores are spindle-shaped (fusoid) with dimensions of 15–20 by 6–9 μm.

See also
List of North American boletes

References

External links

subflavidus
Fungi described in 1938
Fungi of North America